The score for the pirate film Cutthroat Island was composed by John Debney.

The music was performed by the London Symphony Orchestra, with choral contributions by the London Voices and was conducted by David Snell.

Although the actual film was a commercial disaster, the score has been praised for its style, reminiscent of the Golden Age Hollywood swashbuckling scores by Erich Wolfgang Korngold,. It has been noted as one of Debney's greatest compositions, alongside The Passion of the Christ. The score used traditional orchestration backed with choir, a practice Debney considered necessary to avoid the music's sounding "too old fashioned".

Particularly, conservative critics have considered this score as one of the best in the genre.

1995 release
Two CDs were released with the score in 1995, one of them by Silva studios, and another by Nu.Millenia Records. Both releases have the same tracks.

2007 expanded edition
In 2007, Prometheus released a two disc special extended edition, which added 40 cues that were left out of the previous soundtracks or were not used in the film.

In August 2016, La-La Land Records re-issued the 2-disc set.

References

John Debney soundtracks
Film scores
1995 soundtrack albums
Adventure film soundtracks
Comedy film soundtracks